In computational complexity theory, the complexity class FP is the set of function problems that can be solved by a deterministic Turing machine in polynomial time. It is the function problem version of the decision problem class P. Roughly speaking, it is the class of functions that can be efficiently computed on classical computers without randomization.

The difference between FP and P is that problems in P have one-bit, yes/no answers, while problems in FP can have any output that can be computed in polynomial time. For example, adding two numbers is an FP problem, while determining if their sum is odd is in P.

Polynomial-time function problems are fundamental in defining polynomial-time reductions, which are used in turn to define the class of NP-complete problems.

Formal definition
FP is formally defined as follows:

A binary relation  is in FP if and only if there is a deterministic polynomial time algorithm that, given , can find some  such that  holds.

Related complexity classes

 FNP is the set of binary relations for which there is a polynomial time algorithm that, given x and y, checks whether P(x,y) holds.  Just as P and FP are closely related, NP is closely related to FNP. FP = FNP if and only if P = NP.  
 Because a machine that uses logarithmic space has at most polynomially many configurations, FL, the set of function problems which can be calculated in logspace, is contained in FP. It is not known whether FL = FP; this is analogous to the problem of determining whether the decision classes P and L are equal.

References

External links
 Complexity Zoo: FP

Complexity classes